Magarnat-e Yek (also Romanized as Magarnāt-e Yek; also known as Magarnād-e Yek, Magarnāt, and Mogernād) is a village in Shoaybiyeh-ye Sharqi Rural District, Shadravan District, Shushtar County, Khuzestan Province, Iran. At the 2006 census, its population was 547, in 101 families.

References 

Populated places in Shushtar County